In seven-dimensional geometry, a pentellated 7-simplex is a convex uniform 7-polytope with 5th order truncations (pentellation) of the regular 7-simplex.

There are 16 unique pentellations of the 7-simplex with permutations of truncations, cantellations, runcinations, and sterications.

Pentellated 7-simplex

Alternate names
 Small terated octaexon (acronym: seto) (Jonathan Bowers)

Coordinates 
The vertices of the pentellated 7-simplex can be most simply positioned in 8-space as permutations of (0,0,1,1,1,1,1,2). This construction is based on facets of the pentellated 8-orthoplex.

Images

Pentitruncated 7-simplex

Alternate names
 Teritruncated octaexon (acronym: teto) (Jonathan Bowers)

Coordinates 
The vertices of the pentitruncated 7-simplex can be most simply positioned in 8-space as permutations of (0,0,1,1,1,1,2,3). This construction is based on facets of the pentitruncated 8-orthoplex.

Images

Penticantellated 7-simplex

Alternate names
 Terirhombated octaexon (acronym: tero) (Jonathan Bowers)

Coordinates 

The vertices of the penticantellated 7-simplex can be most simply positioned in 8-space as permutations of (0,0,1,1,1,2,2,3). This construction is based on facets of the penticantellated 8-orthoplex.

Images

Penticantitruncated 7-simplex

Alternate names
 Terigreatorhombated octaexon (acronym: tegro) (Jonathan Bowers)

Coordinates 

The vertices of the penticantitruncated 7-simplex can be most simply positioned in 8-space as permutations of (0,0,1,1,1,2,3,4). This construction is based on facets of the penticantitruncated 8-orthoplex.

Pentiruncinated 7-simplex

Alternate names
 Teriprismated octaexon (acronym: tepo) (Jonathan Bowers)

Coordinates 

The vertices of the pentiruncinated 7-simplex can be most simply positioned in 8-space as permutations of (0,0,1,1,2,2,2,3). This construction is based on facets of the pentiruncinated 8-orthoplex.

Images

Pentiruncitruncated 7-simplex

Alternate names
 Teriprismatotruncated octaexon (acronym: tapto) (Jonathan Bowers)

Coordinates 

The vertices of the pentiruncitruncated 7-simplex can be most simply positioned in 8-space as permutations of (0,0,1,1,2,2,3,4). This construction is based on facets of the pentiruncitruncated 8-orthoplex.

Images

Pentiruncicantellated 7-simplex

Alternate names
 Teriprismatorhombated octaexon (acronym: tapro) (Jonathan Bowers)

Coordinates 

The vertices of the pentiruncicantellated 7-simplex can be most simply positioned in 8-space as permutations of (0,0,1,1,2,3,3,4). This construction is based on facets of the pentiruncicantellated 8-orthoplex.

Images

Pentiruncicantitruncated 7-simplex

Alternate names
 Terigreatoprismated octaexon (acronym: tegapo) (Jonathan Bowers)

Coordinates 

The vertices of the pentiruncicantitruncated 7-simplex can be most simply positioned in 8-space as permutations of (0,0,1,1,2,3,4,5). This construction is based on facets of the pentiruncicantitruncated 8-orthoplex.

Images

Pentistericated 7-simplex

Alternate names
 Tericellated octaexon (acronym: teco) (Jonathan Bowers)

Coordinates 
The vertices of the pentistericated 7-simplex can be most simply positioned in 8-space as permutations of (0,0,0,1,2,2,2,3). This construction is based on facets of the pentistericated 8-orthoplex.

Images

Pentisteritruncated 7-simplex

Alternate names
 Tericellitruncated octaexon (acronym: tecto) (Jonathan Bowers)

Coordinates 
The vertices of the pentisteritruncated 7-simplex can be most simply positioned in 8-space as permutations of (0,0,1,2,2,3,4,4). This construction is based on facets of the pentisteritruncated 8-orthoplex.

Images

Pentistericantellated 7-simplex

Alternate names
 Tericellirhombated octaexon (acronym: tecro) (Jonathan Bowers)

Coordinates 
The vertices of the pentistericantellated 7-simplex can be most simply positioned in 8-space as permutations of (0,0,1,2,2,3,3,4). This construction is based on facets of the pentistericantellated 8-orthoplex.

Images

Pentistericantitruncated 7-simplex

Alternate names
 Tericelligreatorhombated octaexon (acronym: tecagro) (Jonathan Bowers)

Coordinates 
The vertices of the pentistericantitruncated 7-simplex can be most simply positioned in 8-space as permutations of (0,0,1,2,2,3,4,5). This construction is based on facets of the pentistericantitruncated 8-orthoplex.

Images

Pentisteriruncinated 7-simplex

Alternate names
 Bipenticantitruncated 7-simplex as t1,2,3,6{3,3,3,3,3,3}
 Tericelliprismated octaexon (acronym: tacpo) (Jonathan Bowers)

Coordinates 
The vertices of the pentisteriruncinated 7-simplex can be most simply positioned in 8-space as permutations of (0,0,1,2,3,3,3,4). This construction is based on facets of the pentisteriruncinated 8-orthoplex.

Images

Pentisteriruncitruncated 7-simplex

Alternate names
 Tericelliprismatotruncated octaexon (acronym: tacpeto) (Jonathan Bowers)

Coordinates 
The vertices of the pentisteriruncitruncated 7-simplex can be most simply positioned in 8-space as permutations of (0,0,1,2,3,3,4,5). This construction is based on facets of the pentisteriruncitruncated 8-orthoplex.

Images

Pentisteriruncicantellated 7-simplex

Alternate names
 Bipentiruncicantitruncated 7-simplex as t1,2,3,4,6{3,3,3,3,3,3}
 Tericelliprismatorhombated octaexon (acronym: tacpro) (Jonathan Bowers)

Coordinates 

The vertices of the pentisteriruncicantellated 7-simplex can be most simply positioned in 8-space as permutations of (0,0,1,2,3,4,4,5). This construction is based on facets of the pentisteriruncicantellated 8-orthoplex.

Images

Pentisteriruncicantitruncated 7-simplex

Alternate names
 Great terated octaexon (acronym: geto) (Jonathan Bowers)

Coordinates 

The vertices of the pentisteriruncicantitruncated 7-simplex can be most simply positioned in 8-space as permutations of (0,0,1,2,3,4,5,6). This construction is based on facets of the pentisteriruncicantitruncated 8-orthoplex.

Images

Related polytopes 

These polytopes are a part of a set of 71 uniform 7-polytopes with A7 symmetry.

Notes

References
 H.S.M. Coxeter: 
 H.S.M. Coxeter, Regular Polytopes, 3rd Edition, Dover New York, 1973 
 Kaleidoscopes: Selected Writings of H.S.M. Coxeter, edited by F. Arthur Sherk, Peter McMullen, Anthony C. Thompson, Asia Ivic Weiss, Wiley-Interscience Publication, 1995,  
 (Paper 22) H.S.M. Coxeter, Regular and Semi Regular Polytopes I, [Math. Zeit. 46 (1940) 380-407, MR 2,10]
 (Paper 23) H.S.M. Coxeter, Regular and Semi-Regular Polytopes II, [Math. Zeit. 188 (1985) 559-591]
 (Paper 24) H.S.M. Coxeter, Regular and Semi-Regular Polytopes III, [Math. Zeit. 200 (1988) 3-45]
 Norman Johnson Uniform Polytopes, Manuscript (1991)
 N.W. Johnson: The Theory of Uniform Polytopes and Honeycombs, Ph.D. 
  x3o3o3o3o3x3o - seto, x3x3o3o3o3x3o - teto, x3o3x3o3o3x3o - tero, x3x3x3oxo3x3o - tegro, x3o3o3x3o3x3o - tepo, x3x3o3x3o3x3o - tapto, x3o3x3x3o3x3o - tapro, x3x3x3x3o3x3o - tegapo, x3o3o3o3x3x3o - teco, x3x3o3o3x3x3o - tecto, x3o3x3o3x3x3o - tecro, x3x3x3o3x3x3o - tecagro, x3o3o3x3x3x3o - tacpo, x3x3o3x3x3x3o - tacpeto, x3o3x3x3x3x3o - tacpro, x3x3x3x3x3x3o - geto

External links 
 Polytopes of Various Dimensions
 Multi-dimensional Glossary

7-polytopes